Ali Al Jallawi (in Arabic علي الجلاوي born in 1975 in Manama, Bahrain) is a poet, researcher, and writer. After two periods of imprisonment for writing poetry critical of the political regime in Bahrain, Al Jallawi has gone on to publish seven volumes of his work, most recently Tashta’il karazat nahd, 2008. He has written books on the Baháʼí and Jewish communities in Bahrain, and presented his poetry at dozens of literary festivals both in the Arab world and elsewhere.  In Manama, he ran a research center dedicated to raising awareness of Bahrain's minority communities. However, during the Bahraini uprising, he fled the country to avoid further imprisonment. The PEN committee organized a literary fellowship in Weimar for him to save him a lengthy application for political asylum in Germany. By May 2012, he was still living in Germany, now as a fellow of the Akademie der Künste in Berlin. He is currently working on a novel titled Yadallah's Shoes.

Description 
With six books of poetry published, Ali is considered one of the more established young Bahraini poets; a strong voice from a new generation of brave auteurs who are not restricted by subject or matter. His already potent body of work proves that he is an eloquent, capable scribe of the Arabic language with his own distinctive style. At the age of 33, Ali's work has been translated into several languages and featured in numerous academic books and literary journals. He has also travelled across the Arab world sharing his poetry.

He began writing as a teenager and in those early years his poetry was characterised by revolutionary and political ideals. So much so, that it led to him being imprisoned in the mid-1990s. It was a turning point in his life as a poet and it gave him the time to reflect and to expand his literary knowledge. Less radical than before, Ali's post-prison work has a more philosophical bent, more in tune with the human spirit and human condition. His is a contemporary voice that is hard to ignore in a country famed for its traditional poetry.

Appearances and events 
Ali Al Jallawi has attended many international and pan-Arab poetry festivals and gatherings to represent Bahrain, including:

 Bait Al-Hikmah, United Kingdom, 1998
 Damascus University, Syria
 29th International Exhibition Book, Kuwait
 Bahrain Cultural Week in Amman, Jordan
 Arab Cultural Capital Festival, Sana'a, Yemen, 2004
 Aseela Festival, Hawar Islands, Bahrain
 6th GCC Poetry Festival, Riyadh
 Arab Cultural Capital Festival, Khartoum, Sudan 2005
 Poetry Tent, Zagoura, Morocco, 2006
 International Poetry Forum, Marrakech, Morocco, 2006
 International Poetry Festival of Medellín, Colombia, 2014

Publications 
 Wajhan li-mra’atin wahida, Dar Al Kunooz, Beirut.
 Al ‘Isyan, Dar Al Mada, Syria.
 Al Madina Al Akhira, Arab Foundation for Studies and Publication, Beirut.
 Dilmuniyat I, Dar Aalia, Kuwait.
 Dilmuniyat II, Dar Kan’aan, Syria.
 Dilmuniyat (both parts, new edition), Ministry of Culture, Yemen, 2004.
 Tashta’il karazat nahd, Al Intishar Al Arabi, Beirut, 2008.

Poetry 
The wisdom of Hallaj

Whenever the heart strives
It commits errors
We know

But
That which is not said by the poem
The prophets understand.

Mansur al-Hallaj: born around 858 in Persia, mystic, writer and teacher of Sufism.

References

External links 
 Ali Al Jallawi website

1975 births
Living people
People from Manama
Bahraini writers
20th-century Bahraini poets
Bahraini prisoners and detainees
Prisoners and detainees of Bahrain
21st-century Bahraini poets